Göran Larsson (24 May 1932 – 27 February 1989) was a Swedish freestyle swimmer.

Swimming career
Larsson competed at the 1952 Summer Olympics in the 100 m and 4 × 200 m relay events and finished in third and fourth place, respectively. He won two gold and one silver medals at the 1950 European Championships. He won the 1951 'Open' British ASA National Championship 110 yards freestyle title  and the 1951 ASA National Championship 220 yards freestyle title.

References

1932 births
1989 deaths
Swedish male backstroke swimmers
Olympic swimmers of Sweden
Swimmers at the 1952 Summer Olympics
Olympic bronze medalists for Sweden
World record setters in swimming
Olympic bronze medalists in swimming
European Aquatics Championships medalists in swimming
Stockholms KK swimmers
Medalists at the 1952 Summer Olympics
Swedish male freestyle swimmers
Sportspeople from Uppsala
20th-century Swedish people